VSRP may refer to:

 Visiting Students Research Programme, a summer programme organised by the Tata Institute of Fundamental Research 
 Virtual Switch Redundancy Protocol, a computer network switching protocol